Star Trek vs. Transformers is a five-issue comic book limited series published by IDW Publishing. It is a crossover between the Star Trek and Transformers franchises, using the characters and art styles from the 1973 cartoon Star Trek: The Animated Series and the 1984 cartoon Transformers The first issue was released in September 2018. The comic was issued as a five part mini-series and has met with favorable reviews for mixing the two science fiction universes. In particular, they praised artist Philip Murphy artistic style with character's which were compared to cel animation.

The comics are written by John Barber and Mike Johnson with art by Philip Murphy and Leonardo Ito as the colorist.

Story

Issue 1: "Prime's Directive, Part One"
Stardate 5892.7.  receives a distress call from Cygnus Seven, a remote dilithium mine near the Klingon border. Unable to contact the planet, Captain Kirk leads Spock, Sulu and M'Ress to the surface, finding the colony under attack by 20th century Earth vehicles without pilots. They attempt to defend against the assault, when a large truck appears, shielding them from the blasts. Mistakenly believing the truck is an attacker, Kirk fires his phaser, damaging it. The truck transforms into Optimus Prime, asking Kirk to protect the humans before collapsing.

The other vehicles reveal themselves as Decepticons and prepare to eliminate the away team. Soundwave's sonic weaponry inadvertently disrupts the static interference blocking communication with the Enterprise, allowing Kirk to order a photon torpedo strike on the Decepticons and forcing them to retreat. The Decepticons follow a homing signal to a nearby moon, where they find Trypticon's fortress mode being controlled by Klingons led by Commander Kuri. Discovering their shared hatred of humans, Megatron proposes an alliance with the Klingons.

Interested on learning more from the unconscious Prime, Kirk calls Scotty and McCoy to the surface to revive him. Spock detects similar energy to Prime's within the nearby mine, and Kirk leads a team to investigate, finding a large metal wall bearing the Autobot insignia. The wall bursts open, revealing more Autobots, and Jazz demands to know what has happened to Optimus Prime.

Issue 2: "Prime's Directive, Part Two"
Spock decides to try and read Optimus Prime's mind, and thus utilizes a Vulcan mind meld. He learns about the planet Cybertron, Orion Pax, and Megatron. But then Spock is overwhelmed, and McCoy has to break the psychic link to save his friend.

Prime however regains consciousness. He thanks the Enterprise trio for their efforts, intrigued by Spock's non-human ability to probe minds. Spock in turn introduces himself, McCoy and Scotty, and proceeds to update Optimus Prime on recent developments. He concludes by declaring that Prime is now the only robot left on Cygnus Seven, to which the Autobot leader surprisingly contradicts him.

Commander Kuri admits that it was a confrontation with Kirk and the Enterprise that forced the Klingons to crash land near Trypticon. Megatron is scornful as to why the Decepticons should require their assistance, so Kuri offers his new allies the use of a Klingon cloaking device.

The first contact between Kirk's away team and the unusually aggressive Autobots deteriorates into an all-out brawl. Kirk tries to negotiate a truce to the hostilities, insisting that Optimus Prime is being tended to by Starfleet personnel.

Bumblebee explains that when the humans commenced World War III, the abandoned Autobots left 20th Century Earth in Fortress Maximus to search for Energon deposits. The Decepticons ambushed them in deep space in Trypticon, and the resulting battle caused both robot factions to crash on Cygnus Seven. The mining colony there unknowingly restarted the autonomous repair protocols within Fortress Maximus, only for the Decepticons to be revived first.

Spock is in the process of notifying Lt. Arex of the situation below, when the Klingons suddenly de-cloak and launch a blistering attack on the Enterprise. Optimus Prime (en route to the mine with Spock, McCoy and Scotty) is simultaneously forced to take refuge from the Decepticons, who seal the mine entrance once again. Ratchet proposes a daring plan to revive Fortress Maximus, to which Kirk pledges support.

Issue 3: "Prime's Directive, Part Three"
The Decepticons rampage against the Cygnus Seven miners. Optimus Prime (despite being damaged) physically protects the colonists, while Spock and Scotty do their best to drive off the attackers. McCoy reprimands Prime for his recklessness, comparing his action to something which Kirk then attempt. Scotty then notices that they haven't heard back from the mine away team.

Kirk meanwhile is being subjected to a two-way neural scan by Ratchet, deep within the Autobot base. The device not only imparts Cybertronian robotic data to Kirk, but also studies his memories for technical specifications regarding a very familiar Federation starship.

The Decepticons eventually corner Optimus Prime, the miners, Spock, Scotty and McCoy. Starscream issues Prime an ultimatum to surrender, but Spock volunteers to take his place. Kuri then beams down from a hovering Bird-of-Prey to personally gloat over the Klingon Empire's apparent victory over the Federation. Spock (with Prime's support) requests that the miners be released. The Decepticons however refuse to show leniency, and prepare to destroy Optimus Prime.

The Decepticons are thwarted by the timely intervention of the USS Enterprise (inexplicably arriving out of the mine, and adorned with an Autobot symbol). The other Autobots (accompanied by Sulu and M'ress) also emerge to engage the Decepticons in combat. Closer interior inspection of the "starship" reveals it to really be a gigantic Cybertonian construct. Kirk is mentally powering the vessel, while Ratchet once again monitors his human vital signs.

The Bird-of-Prey suddenly reveals itself to be a camouflaged Trypticon, who promptly repels the counterattack. Optimus Prime tries to warn Spock and his colleagues to take cover, only to be blindsided by Megatron. Kuri orders his Klingon soldiers to commence massacring the overall enemy, but the Enterprise construct manages to transport the miners, several crew members, and the odd Autobot safely on board.

The single-handed effort of piloting the construct is exhausting Kirk. But when Trypticon threatens the Enterprise and everyone aboard and near it, he follows Ratchet's guidance and mentally instructs the vessel—to transform. The massive humanoid figure of Fortress Tiberius instantaneously appears, an incredible amalgamation of Autobot and Starfleet technology!

Issue 4: "Prime's Directive, Part Four"
The newly configured Fortress Tiberius utters a stentorian battle cry as he executes a masterful counter-offensive against Trypticon, scoring several successive strikes.

But complications soon arise, within. Despite Ratchet's best advice, the fragmented resonant emotions of Fortress Maximus (whose former body now houses the duplicate Enterprise) seriously begin to corrupt Kirk's concentration and coordination.

McCoy reports that the miners (plus himself, Spock, Scotty and Arcee) are becoming traumatized by the extremity of the outer conflict. And Spock is quick to illustrate the fact that Kirk would seriously violate Starfleet protocol, should he actually destroy Trypticon.

Megatron is astonished at the existence of a human-controlled Cybertronian Titan, but is nonetheless confident that Trypticon will emerge victorious. Kuri is equally amazed, especially since Starscream has apparently been conducting secret negotiations with the Klingon crew, assuring them of automatic victory. But during the erupting pandemonium, Starscream secretly infiltrates the dilithium containment facility beneath Cygnus Seven, revealing an even more grandiose objective in mind.

The mentally conflicted Kirk momentarily hesitates during combat, thus allowing Trypticon to retaliate with a fireball attack. But with Ratchet's assistance, Kirk eventually regains control of his faculties, thus allowing Fortress Tiberius to deliver a near knockout punch to Trypticon. Optimus Prime meanwhile fights back against Megatron, bolstered by the eventual arrival of Jazz, Bumblebee, Wingblade, Sulu and M’ress.

Loaded with pilfered dilithium, Starscream then attempts to escape unseen. Megatron (after finally turning on and betraying his supposed Klingon collaborators) spots his departure and becomes obsessed with hunting down and punishing the traitor. The Decepticons retreat to pursue the fugitive Starscream, and Spock beams down from Fortress Tiberius to reunite with a triumphant Sulu and M’ress. With the aid of the remaining Autobots, they have successfully apprehended the abandoned Kuri and his soldiers.

The real Enterprise is still drifting helplessly in space, following the earlier ambush. Uhura is shocked to receive a message to her mayday transmission – from Captain Kirk (still mentally piloting Fortress Tiberius, travelling in identical starship mode). While the Klingons are transported to the brig, Spock and most of the other Starfleet personnel are beamed back on deck, and the Autobots are safely deposited in the hangar bay.

A second (and more concrete) alliance has been formulated, in order to pursue the Decepticons into Klingon occupied territory (although Kirk realises that to do so would be a considered an act of war by the Empire). The inhabitants of Kronos however have a more immediate threat to contend with – Starscream has finally landed. And he has conquest on his mind!

Issue 5: "Prime's Directive, Part Five (Conclusion)"
The Enterprise and its Cybertronian replica maintain a synchronized orbit over Cygnus Seven, where all respective parties confer on the current situation.

Kirk (aided by Ratchet and McCoy aboard Fortress Tiberius) consults with Spock (the acting captain aboard the real Enterprise) as to the logistics of invading the Klingon Empire. Spock agrees with Kirk's sentiment to take action, but stresses the star-ship's current weakened state.

Scotty agrees with the structural diagnosis.  Optimus Prime then volunteers that he and his fellow Autobots will continue alone into Klingon Space to stop the Decepticons. Kirk insists that the Autobots will require back-up support, but does agree with Prime's noble resolve, citing the Federation's most important law (the Prime Directive), an oath of non-interference with developing cultures.

Optimus Prime then delivers an oath of his own, the thus termed Prime's Directive: "By action or inaction, I shall allow Cybertronians to cause no harm to any civilization, no matter their relationship with my allies!"

The Klingon High Council meanwhile hold an emergency meeting on Kronos, to discuss their own forces vanishing from Cygnus Seven, and multiple unidentified vessels trespassing through the Neutral Zone. Convinced that total war on the Federation is the only available solution, the Klingons are suddenly attacked by a monstrous metallic intruder who arrogantly declares himself the newly appointed Emperor Starscream the First!

Kirk openly wrestles with the moral dilemma of not abandoning the Autobots, yet also not endangering his own crew. Optimus Prime empathizes with the Starfleet captain, admitting that he wished that he had more than one life to lay down for his comrades. This sympathetic comment suddenly gives Kirk an idea, then asking Scotty how much inorganic matter the shipboard replicators could generate within the six-hour timeframe to reach the Klingon home-world.

Emperor Starscream threatens the Klingons with instantaneous death (should they refuse to accept his rule). But since the average Klingon believes death is a worthy honour, the High Council openly laugh in his face. An enraged Starscream fires a warning shot to enforce his threat, but the capitol building is then bombarded, and Starscream is soon dethroned by Megatron and the other Decepticons.

Megatron orders Soundwave to marshal the new Klingon workforce for immediate dilithium mining, but is soon interrupted by the arrival of the transformed Fortress Tiberius, the Autobots - and several perfectly replicated battle suits of Cybertronian armour (specifically piloted by Spock, Scotty, Sulu, and M'ress).

Kirk also reveals that he has pardoned Commander Kuri and his crew for past crimes, the Decepticon's former allies now having changed sides and encouraging their fellow Klingons to help repel the evil robots. Megatron orders the Decepticons to launch an all-out offensive against the combined resistance, and quickly gains the upper hand via Soundwave orchestrating a second sonic barrage. A confident Megatron savours his victory over Optimus Prime, duly informing Kirk that he intends to next conquer Earth. Kuri however informs Megatron that Klingons are thankfully immune to sonic attacks, and that Kirk (while having the Cybertronian armour replicated) discovered certain imperfections to exploit, passing the information on to the grateful Klingons. Newly modified Birds-of-Prey then materialise above the Kronos landscape, promptly dispatching the now vulnerable Decepticons.  An avenged Kuri announces that the Decepticons clearly underestimated his race, the Klingons were more than meets the eye!

The Federation manages to negotiate a somewhat tenuous truce with the Klingon Empire, who stipulate that they alone must assume responsibility of the Decepticons. The triumphant Autobots assume independent control of their newly renovated Titan, with Optimus Prime pledging continual allegiance to both Kirk and the Federation. Fortress Tiberius then embarks on an unspecified mission to the final frontier, and Kirk (on behalf of the entire Enterprise crew) wishes their newfound friends a safe journey with the following adapted cultural farewell:

"Live Long, Autobots - and ROLL OUT!"

Reception 
The series has met with a positive response, and Philip Murphy's artistic direction was praised.

WhatCulture did not expect a good result from combining animated Star Trek and Transformers, yet they credited the IDW as making it work.

See also
List of Star Trek comics

References

Comics based on Star Trek
Crossover comics
Transformers comics
Fiction set in the 23rd century